Drama in Moscow, is a 1909 Russian short drama directed and written by Vasili Goncharov.

Plot 
The film tells about the actress, who is given a telegraph from which she learns that she can get one hundred thousand rubles, because she won the process. After that, she, along with a fan walking around Moscow, visit various restaurants. While walking in the park, a fan tries to kiss the actress, but she does not allow him to do this, as a result of which the fan shoots at her and then - into herself.

Starring 
 Pyotr Chardynin
 Aleksandra Goncharova

References

External links 
 

1909 films
1900s Russian-language films
Russian silent short films
Russian black-and-white films
Films directed by Vasily Goncharov
Films of the Russian Empire
Russian drama films
1909 drama films
1909 short films
Silent drama films